The 1992–93 NBA season was the Timberwolves' 4th season in the National Basketball Association. In the 1992 NBA draft, the Timberwolves selected Christian Laettner out of Duke University with the third overall pick. In the off-season, the team acquired Chuck Person and Michael Williams from the Indiana Pacers. However, after a 2–2 start to the season, the T-Wolves continued to struggle losing 28 of their next 33 games, as head coach Jimmy Rodgers was fired after a 6–23 start to the season. Under his replacement Sidney Lowe, the team held a 12–35 record at the All-Star break, and suffered a 12-game losing streak in April, finishing fifth in the Midwest Division with a 19–63 record.

Laettner had a solid rookie season averaging 18.2 points and 8.7 rebounds per game, while being selected to the NBA All-Rookie First Team. Doug West continued to increase his scoring leading the team with 19.3 points per game, while Person provided the team with 16.8 points and 5.6 rebounds per game, and Williams contributed 15.1 points, 8.7 assists and 2.2 steals per game. Following the season, Felton Spencer was traded to the Utah Jazz.

In the final game of the season against the Jazz on April 25, 1993, Williams set an NBA record of 84 consecutive free throws surpassing Calvin Murphy, whose record was 78 back in 1981. The Timberwolves defeated the Jazz, 113–111 at home to end their 12-game losing streak. Williams shot .907 in free-throw percentage this season.

Draft picks

Roster

Regular season

Season standings

y - clinched division title
x - clinched playoff spot

z - clinched division title
y - clinched division title
x - clinched playoff spot

Record vs. opponents

Game log

Player statistics

Awards and records
 Christian Laettner, NBA All-Rookie Team 1st Team

Transactions

References

See also
 1992-93 NBA season

Minnesota Timberwolves seasons
Timber
Timber
Monnesota